Garnes Township is a township in Red Lake County, Minnesota, United States. The population was 174 at the 2000 census.

Garnes Township was named for E. K. Garnes, a Norwegian settler.

Geography

Demographics

As of the census of 2000, there were 174 people, 70 households, and 49 families residing in the township. The population density was 3.6 people per square mile (1.4/km2). There were 80 housing units at an average density of 1.7/sq mi (0.6/km2). The racial makeup of the township was 96.55% White, 2.87% African American and 0.57% Native American. Hispanic or Latino of any race were 0.57% of the population.

There were 70 households, out of which 31.4% had children under the age of 18 living with them, 64.3% were married couples living together, 1.4% had a female householder with no husband present, and 28.6% were non-families. 25.7% of all households were made up of individuals, and 11.4% had someone living alone who was 65 years of age or older. The average household size was 2.49 and the average family size was 3.00.

In the township the population was spread out, with 25.3% under the age of 18, 9.2% from 18 to 24, 25.3% from 25 to 44, 26.4% from 45 to 64, and 13.8% who were 65 years of age or older. The median age was 37 years. For every 100 females, there were 120.3 males. For every 100 females age 18 and over, there were 132.1 males.

The median income for a household in the township was $40,625, and the median income for a family was $48,438. Males had a median income of $25,625 versus $19,688 for females. The per capita income for the township was $16,725. About 8.8% of families and 11.2% of the population were below the poverty line, including 14.0% of those under the age of eighteen and 50.0% of those 65 or over.

References

Townships in Red Lake County, Minnesota
Townships in Minnesota